Imran Chaudhri (born 1973) is a British-American designer, who created user interface and interaction designs for the iPhone. While at Apple from 1995 to 2017, he was a designer on products including the Mac, iPod, iPhone, iPad, Apple TV, Apple Watch, AirPods, and HomePod.

Career
After starting at Apple as an intern in 1995, Chaudhri spent 19 years working at Apple as a designer. He and fellow designer Bas Ording updated the appearance of macOS and worked to create a new touch-based interface, replacing buttons with gestures. Chaudhri is credited as an inventor on several Apple patents, including a touch screen.

Chaudhri was part of a small iPhone design team that made the original iPhone interface. Previously, he worked on Dashboard, a widget interface on macOS. In addition to creating many iPhone features with other designers, Chaudhri created a grid of square app icons to organize the iPhone's functions, commonly referred to as the home screen, complete with its rearrangement functionality.

Chaudhri left Apple in early 2017 to form his own technology company, Humane, along with his wife, Bethany Bongiorno, who he met while both were working on the iPad.

Further reading
 Kahney, Leander. Jony Ive: The Genius Behind Apple's Greatest Products, New York: Portfolio/Penguin, 2013. 
 Merchant, Brian. The One Device: The Secret History of the iPhone, New York: Little, Brown and Company, 2017.

References

External links
 Imran Chaudhri on Google Patents

1973 births
Living people
American people of British descent
Interface designers
Product designers
British industrial designers
British software engineers
Apple Inc. executives
IPhone
British technology company founders